Marek Petruš (born 5 October 1975) is retired Slovak footballer, and manager currently the manager of Tatran Prešov. He has also played in Israel and Russia.

Honours

As coach
 Tatran Liptovský Mikuláš
 2.Liga: Winners 2020-21 (Promoted)

References

External links 

 

1975 births
Living people
Sportspeople from Prešov
Slovak footballers
Slovak football managers
Slovak expatriate footballers
Association football defenders
1. FC Tatran Prešov players
Bnei Yehuda Tel Aviv F.C. players
Kardemir Karabükspor footballers
ŠK Slovan Bratislava players
Partizán Bardejov players
FK Spišská Nová Ves players
Slovak Super Liga players
Slovak expatriate sportspeople in Israel
Slovak expatriate sportspeople in Russia
Expatriate footballers in Israel
Expatriate footballers in Russia
FK Poprad managers
MFK Tatran Liptovský Mikuláš managers
1. FC Tatran Prešov managers
2. Liga (Slovakia) managers
Slovak Super Liga managers
3. Liga (Slovakia) managers